The Jihad Wahl training camp was an alleged al Qaeda training camp in Afghanistan.

Prior to 1996, Abu Ubaidah al-Banshiri, Mohammed Atef and Yaseen al-Iraqi aided Enaam Arnaout in purchasing AK-47s and mortar rounds from a Pashtun tribesman named Hajjji Ayoub, and they were subsequently delivered in large trucks to the Jawr and Jihad Wahl training camps.

Allegations prepared for Salem Abdul Salem Ghereby's Combatant Status Review Tribunal and first and second annual Administrative Review Board hearings stated he attended the Jihad Wahl camp in 1996:
{| class="wikitable"
|
One of the detainee's aliases appeared on a list of individuals who reportedly trained at an al Qaida training camp at Jihad Wahl, Afghanistan in 1996.
The detainee attended the Jihad Wahl Camp near Khowst, Afghanistan in 1996.
|}

Hassan Mohammed Ali Bin Attash, also known as Hassan Mohammed Salih Bin Attash. faced allegations during his first and second annual Administrative Review Board hearings that he also attended bomb-making course at the Jiwad Wahl camp, in 1997, when he was about twelve years old.

Ahmed al-Darbi was also accused of attending the same camp.

Abu Jaffar el Masry, Haydar Dosari and Salem el-Masri taught the proper use of explosives at the camp.

In 2007 Mohammed Soliman Barre had his continued detention justified, in part, based on the allegation: "The detainee was identified as being selected by al Qaida for more advanced training and specialized coursework at the Jihad Wal Camp, courses usually reserved only for sworn al Qaida members.".

References

Al-Qaeda facilities
Buildings and structures in Afghanistan
Khost Province